Geoffrey or Godfrey was the second eldest son of Roger I of Sicily. He was probably a bastard, like his elder brother Jordan, but he may have been a legitimate son by either Judith of Évreux or Eremburga of Mortain. Either way, he stood no chance of inheriting, for he had leprosy (morbus elephantinus), or some similar disease. He never married, but was engaged to a daughter of Boniface del Vasto.

His father loved him no less and bestowed on him the county of Ragusa. He retired to a monastery to live out his days and died sometime between 1096 and 1120.

Notes

Sources
Houben, Hubert (translated by Graham A. Loud and Diane Milburn). Roger II of Sicily: Ruler between East and West. Cambridge University Press, 2002.
Curtis, Edmund. Roger of Sicily and the Normans in Lower Italy 1016-1154. G.P. Putnam's Sons: London, 1912.

External links
 "La Citta' Di Ragusa" (story)

Sicilian people of Norman descent
Italo-Normans
Italian Christian monks